Last Chance Creek may refer to:
The creek in which the Four Georgians discovered gold, in what is now Helena, Montana
Last Chance Gulch, the main street of Helena, Montana, beneath which flows what remains of this creek
Last Chance Creek (Plumas County, California)
A creek in southern Utah
A creek in Yukon Territory, Canada
A creek in Alaska

There are probably many other creeks with this name, as it was common for prospectors to decide that a particular location was their "last chance" to find gold before having to return for supplies.

Gold rushes